Laybourne is a surname. Notable people with the surname include:

Geraldine Laybourne (born 1947), American serial entrepreneur in media and technology
Jack Laybourne (born 1927), English former footballer, competitor at the 1956 Summer Olympics
Kit Laybourne, TV producer and educator
Rachel Laybourne (born 1982), British volleyball player
Roxie Collie Laybourne (1910–2003), American ornithologist born in Fayetteville, North Carolina
Louis Laybourne Smith CMG (1880–1965), architect and educator in South Australia
Sam Laybourne (born 1974), American actor and producer

See also
Woods, Bagot, Laybourne Smith & Irwin, global architectural and consulting practice founded in Australia
Claybourne
Larry Bourne
Laybourn